Elachista beltira is a moth in the family Elachistidae. It was described by Lauri Kaila in 2000. It is found in Chile.

References

Moths described in 2000
beltira
Moths of South America
Endemic fauna of Chile